Emilee is a given name and variant of the given name Emily.

Emilee may refer to:

Emilee Anderson, American ski jumper
Emilee Cherry (born 1992), Australian Rugby Union player
Emilee Flood, singer known by the mononym Emilee, famous for being featured in "ILY (I Love You Baby)"
Emilee Klein (born 1974), American golfer and golf coach 
Emilee O'Neil (born 1983), American soccer 
Emilee Wallace (born 1989), American actress

See also
Emily (given name)
Emil (given name)
Emilia (given name)
Émilie, a French feminine given name
Emily (disambiguation)